Sergii Chebotarenko  (born May 26, 1984, Kyiv) is a Ukrainian film director and producer, a member of the Ukrainian Film Academy. He made his debut with the feature film Pulse (2021) which won the awards at the international festivals in America and Europe.

Work

He started his career as an advertising director in 2009. For 10 years he shot commercials for big brands such as Lenovo, Honda, Subaru, Volkswagen, and Socar.

Since 2016, he has been shooting music videos for such artists as Masha Sobko, Alyona-Alyona, Vremya i Steklo, Kalush and others.

2021 debuted with the feature film Pulse. The work process on the film took more than 3 years. Pulse is based on the biography of a young athlete who was involved in a car accident and almost completely lost her sight. But she finds strength in herself and returns to the big sport.

In January 2021, the Flathead Lake International Film Festival  hosted the international premiere of the film in America.

In 2021 he became a member of the Ukrainian Film Academy.

In 2021 he began work on a new feature film about Igor Sikorsky.

Awards

He received two major awards at the Flathead Lake International Film Festival Winning two nominations for the Best Film and the Best Director.
In France, the film was awarded the Jury Award at the Nice International Film Festival
At the American Film Festival Richmond International Film Festival (RIFF) - victory in two nominations for Best Film and Best Actress . And Jury Award The best of festival.

Family

Married to Anna Chebotarenko. Two children - a daughter Emily and a son Mark.

References

External links
Official website
IMDb

Living people
1984 births
Ukrainian film directors
Ukrainian film producers
Film people from Kyiv
Ukrainian music video directors